Thomas Rae (17 June 1881 – 1957) was a Scottish footballer who played in the Football League for Bury.

References

1881 births
1957 deaths
Scottish footballers
Footballers from North Ayrshire
People from Kilwinning
English Football League players
Association football wing halves
Kilwinning Rangers F.C. players
Scottish Football League players
Scottish Junior Football Association players
Greenock Morton F.C. players
Bury F.C. players
St Mirren F.C. players